Punta Gorda Airport may refer to:

 Punta Gorda Airport (Belize) in Punta Gorda, Belize
 Punta Gorda Airport (Florida) in Punta Gorda, Florida, United States